The United States census  of 1830, the fifth  census undertaken in the United States, was conducted on June 1, 1830. The only loss of census records for 1830 involved some countywide losses in Massachusetts, Maryland, and Mississippi.

It determined the population of the 24 states to be 12,866,020, of which 2,009,043 were slaves. The center of population was about 170 miles (274 km) west of Washington, D.C. in present-day Grant County, West Virginia.

This was the first census in which a cityNew Yorkrecorded a population of over 200,000.

Census questions

The 1830 census asked these questions:
 Name of head of family
 Address
 Number of free white males and females
 in five-year age groups to age 20
 in 10-year age groups from 20 to 100
 100 years and older
 number of slaves and free colored persons in six age groups
 number of deaf and dumb
 under 14 years old
 14 to 24 years old
 25 years and older
 number of blind
 foreigners not naturalized

Data availability
No microdata from the 1830 population census are available, but aggregate data for small areas, together with compatible cartographic boundary files, can be downloaded from the National Historical Geographic Information System.

State rankings

City rankings

References

Further reading
 Historic US Census data

United States Census, 1830
United States census
United States